Clevland may refer to:

 Clevland Town, Bangalore, a suburb of Cox Town, Bangalore

People with the surname
Augustus Clevland (1754–1784), East India Company administrator in the Province of Bengal
John Clevland (1706–1763) of Tapeley, Westleigh, Devon, MP and Secretary to the Admiralty
John Clevland (1734–1817) of Tapeley, Westleigh, Devon, Member of Parliament for Barnstaple from 1766 to 1802
William Clevland (1664–1734) of Tapeley, Westleigh, Devon, Royal Navy commander, Controller of Storekeepers' Accounts
William Clevland (king) (1720–1758), Anglo-Scot, self-appointed King of the Banana Islands off the coast of present-day Sierra Leone

See also

Cleland (disambiguation)
Cleveland (disambiguation)
Clevelandia (disambiguation)